Fábio Pereira Baptista (born 29 March 2001), known as Fabinho, is a Portuguese professional footballer who plays as a right-back for Belgian club Sint-Truiden.

Club career
On 1 July 2022, Baptista signed with Sint-Truiden in Belgium.

Career statistics

Club

Notes

References

External links

2001 births
Living people
Footballers from Lisbon
Portuguese footballers
Portugal youth international footballers
Portuguese people of Cape Verdean descent
Association football defenders
S.U. Sintrense players
S.L. Benfica B players
Sint-Truidense V.V. players
Liga Portugal 2 players
Portuguese expatriate footballers
Expatriate footballers in Belgium
Portuguese expatriate sportspeople in Belgium